USS Indianapolis (LCS-17) is a  littoral combat ship of the United States Navy. She is the fourth vessel in the navy named after Indianapolis, Indiana.

Design 
In 2002, the US Navy initiated a program to develop the first of a fleet of littoral combat ships. The Navy initially ordered two monohull ships from Lockheed Martin, which became known as the Freedom-class littoral combat ships after the first ship of the class, . Odd-numbered U.S. Navy littoral combat ships are built using the Freedom-class monohull design, while even-numbered ships are based on a competing design, the trimaran hull  from General Dynamics. The initial order of littoral combat ships involved a total of four ships, including two of the Freedom-class design.  Indianapolis is the tenth Freedom-class littoral combat ship to be built.

Indianapolis includes additional stability improvements over the original Freedom design; the stern transom was lengthened and buoyancy tanks were added to the stern to increase weight service and enhance stability. The ship will also feature automated sensors to allow "conditions-based maintenance" and reduce crew overwork and fatigue issues that Freedom had on her first deployment.

Construction and career 
Marinette Marine was awarded the contract to build the ship on 29 December 2010. Construction began on 18 July 2016 and she was launched on 18 April 2018. she is homeported to Naval Station Mayport, Florida and assigned to assigned to Littoral Combat Ship Squadron Two.

Indianapolis was commissioned in a ceremony at Burns Harbor, Indiana on 26 October 2019.

As of March 2020, Indianapolis is billeted to act in the mine countermeasures (MCM) role.

References

 
 

Freedom-class littoral combat ships
Lockheed Martin
2018 ships
Ships built by Marinette Marine